Uxbridge Town Hall is the town hall of Uxbridge, Massachusetts, located at 45 South Main Street.  It is listed on the National Register of Historic Places.  It was built in 1879 and added to the historic registry 100 years later. Amos P. Cutting of Worcester was the architect. Ferry & Gardner of Springfield also submitted plans.

An old burial ground had to be relocated to build the town hall. It continues to serve as the administrative headquarters for the town government. In the 1930s its auditorium showed movies, and live bands played here for weekend entertainment.  Until recent times it also served as the police headquarters. It was listed on the National Register of Historic Places in 1983.

See also
National Register of Historic Places listings in Uxbridge, Massachusetts

References

City and town halls on the National Register of Historic Places in Massachusetts
Buildings and structures in Uxbridge, Massachusetts
Town halls in Massachusetts
National Register of Historic Places in Uxbridge, Massachusetts